Jalan Pogoh (Johor state route J41) is a main state road in Johor, connecting Segamat and Bukit Kepong. It is the main road of the Mukim Pogoh in Segamat. Jalan Pogoh had been only paved halfway from Segamat to Kampung Pogoh. At the end of the 1990s, the entire road was fully paved. During the pavement works for the remaining stretch, works included raising the road level because of the flood-prone areas along the stretch and also replacing all wooden bridges along the road with concrete bridges, thus abolishing the former weight limit of the road, previously 8 tonnes.

List of junctions

References 

Roads in Johor